Horufadhi (Hor-u-fadhi, Horu-fadhi, Horufadi, Horofadhi, Horafadi) is a town in the Togdheer region of Somaliland which comes under the Buhoodle District.

History

Horufadhi is mentioned as Horufadi in a book published in England in 1951. According to this book, in Horufadhi, nomads of the Solemadu branch of the Habr Je'lo, Isaaq clan and the Yahia, Aligherri and Hagr Adan branch of the Dhulbahante clan used wells during the dry season.

In January 2012, former rebel militias based in Horufadhi and other locations joined the Somaliland army.

In April 2013, one person was killed in a clash between Jaamac Siyaad and Reer Hagar of the Dhulbahante clan in the Horufadhi district.

In February 2015, Somaliland forces attacked militias in Horufadhi as part of relations with the Khatumo State.

In March 2016, members of the Somali federal government visited Ceegaag, which led the Somaliland government to establish a military base between Ceegaag and Horufadhi.

According to an April 2016 report, Buhoodle District used to consume crops from southern Somalia, but has recently become more dependent on local crops such as Horufadhi.

In July 2017, Horufadhi was one of the sources of a cholera outbreak and medical assistance was provided.

In September 2017, the Puntland government attempted to send food to drought-affected towns such as Horufadhi, but was blocked by the Somaliland government at Las Anod.

In December 2019, there was a murder in the Horufadhi district, which led to a conflict between clans. In June 2020, the Minister of Public Works and Housing of Somaliland visited Horufadhi. The main purpose is to resolve clan conflicts. On 5 July 2020, at least two people were killed in a clash between Hayaag and Hagar of the Dhulbahante clan in the Horufadhi district. On 20 July, the peace conference between Hayaag and Hagar was concluded. Another meeting to the same effect was held in Sahdheer in August.

Notable people
Garaad Abdulahi Garaad Soofe - One of the elders of the Dhulbahante clan. He waw born in Horufadhi.

References

External links
Horufadhi

Populated places in Togdheer